The Solihull Metropolitan Borough Council elections were held on Thursday, 8 May 1986, with one third of the council to be elected. The Conservatives retained control of the council. Voter turnout was 34.6%.

Election result

|- style="background-color:#F9F9F9"
! style="background-color: " |
| Independent Ratepayers & Residents 
| align="right" | 2
| align="right" | 2
| align="right" | 0
| align="right" | +2
| align="right" | 11.8
| align="right" | 8.3
| align="right" | 4,503
| align="right" | +0.2%
|-

This result had the following consequences for the total number of seats on the council after the elections:

Ward results

|- style="background-color:#F6F6F6"
! style="background-color: " |
| colspan="2"   | Independent Residents gain from Conservative
| align="right" | Swing
| align="right" | -0.8
|-

|- style="background-color:#F6F6F6"
! style="background-color: " |
| colspan="2"   | Independent Residents & Ratepayers gain from Conservative
| align="right" | Swing
| align="right" | +4.5
|-

References

1986 English local elections
1986
1980s in the West Midlands (county)